Donald Johnson and Francisco Montana were the defending champions, but they chose to compete in Montreal at the same week.

Paul Kilderry and Nicolás Lapentti won the title by defeating Andrew Kratzmann and Libor Pimek 3–6, 7–5, 7–6 in the final.

Seeds

Draw

Draw

References

External links
 Official results archive (ATP)
 Official results archive (ITF)

Doubles